BBC Nepali is one of the 27 language services provided under the BBC World Service's foreign language output. It broadcasts in the Nepali language on FM and over the internet.

History

BBC Nepali was launched on 7 June 1969 as a weekly program on the BBC World Service. In the early years the programs were hosted by Nepali students studying in the United Kingdom. In 1970 BBC’s Nepali output became available five days a week, and later was made available on every day of the week. 
Initially, the programs were directed at British Gorkha soldiers working in Hong Kong. Later it became widely popular in the Nepali community as impartial and trustworthy news broadcasting. Today the broadcasts are received by Nepali speakers worldwide.

Programming 

BBC Nepali concentrates on news, analysis, and discussion. It covers 15 minutes of Radio Time. A daily fifteen-minute program is transmitted at 08:45 PM (UTC +15:00).
Basically, the fifteen minutes program is concentrated just on news & other certain programmes like BBC common issues program is a very effective program.

See also 

 BBC
 BBC World Service
 BBC News
 BBC newsreaders and journalists
 BBC television news programmes
 :List of BBC newsreaders and reporters
 List of former BBC newsreaders and journalists
 List of companies based in London
 List of television programmes broadcast by the BBC
 Stations of the BBC
 The Green Book
 British television
 Early television stations
 Gaelic broadcasting in Scotland
 Public service broadcasting in the United Kingdom
 Quango, an abbreviation for quasi-autonomous non-governmental organisation

References

External links 
 BBC Nepali
 Listen to BBC Nepali

Nepali
Radio stations in Nepal
Nepalese journalism
Nepal–United Kingdom relations
1969 establishments in the United Kingdom
Radio stations established in 1969
1969 establishments in Nepal